Prairie Rivers Network (PRN) is a non-profit organization (a registered 501(c)(3) organization in the United States), located in Champaign, Illinois. The organization describes its mission:
"Using the creative power of science, law, and collective action, we protect and restore our rivers, return healthy soils and diverse wildlife to our lands, and transform how we care for the earth and for each other."

History 
The organization was founded in 1967 by Bruce and Patricia Hannon under the name Committee on Allerton Park. Initially organized to stop a dam project by the United States Army Corps of Engineers on the Sangamon River near Decatur, Illinois. The dam was opposed because the resulting reservoir would have flooded large parts of Allerton Park and adjacent lands. The effort to stop that project, that would have created the Oakley Reservoir, was ultimately successful and it was federally deauthorized in 1985.
The organization changed its name in 1984 to Central States Education Center, and again in 1998 to Prairie Rivers Network.

PRN advocates for waterways and the health of riparian ecosystems through Illinois. The key areas of the PRN's work include pollution from industrial agriculture and factory farming, contamination from coal ash and coal mining, and working with communities and farmers on efforts to maintain and restore the health of soil and water.

Coal ash and the suit against Dynegy 
In May 2018, PRN, represented by Earthjustice, sued the company Dynegy over violations of the Clean Water Act resulting from coal ash piles along the Middle Fork of the Vermilion River. The coal ash piles are connected to the Vermilion Power Station, which was closed by Dynegy in 2011. The Power Station was built by Illinois Power along the west bank of the Vermilion River in 1956, and acquired by Dynegy in 2000. After the station's closure in 2011, Dynegy merged with Vistra Energy Corporation, and the new company now operates under the name Vistra.

References

External links 
Prairie Rivers Network
The History of Allerton Park
Ecojustice Collaborative
Crane, Tracey, "Dynegy faces federal lawsuit over coal-ash pits on Middle Fork," The News Gazette, May 31, 2018. Accessed February 3, 2019.
Brighton, Jack, "Loose Regulations Allow Coal Ash To Threaten River," Illinois Public Media News, September 7, 2018. Accessed February 3, 2019.
"Coal Ash Threat Dead Ahead!," The Mike Nowak Show, Accessed February 3, 2019.

Environmental organizations based in Illinois
Organizations established in 1967